Motazz Moussa (born 1967) is a Sudanese politician who served as Prime Minister of Sudan from September 2018 until his dismissal in February 2019. Prior to his appointment he served as Minister of Irrigation and Electricity.

Prime Minister of Sudan
He was appointed to the post by the country's president, Omar al-Bashir, replacing Bakri Hassan Saleh, following the government's dissolution. The dissolution of the government was brought about due to recent shortages of bread, fuel, and hard currency. In February 2019, President Bashir dismissed Moussa's government, in the wake of protests against his rule. In addition to prime ministership, Moussa hold the office of Minister of Finance.

References

1967 births
Living people
People of the Sudanese Revolution
Prime Ministers of Sudan
Finance ministers of Sudan
Water ministers of Sudan
University of Khartoum alumni